Somerset Area High School is a public high school in Somerset, Pennsylvania, United States, the county seat of Somerset County. The school serves about 700 students in grades 9-12 and is attached to the Somerset Area Middle School.

Academics
Students at Somerset area may participate in career tracks  including: 
 College Preparatory
 Information Management & Technology
 Agriculture Education
 Career/Technology - Students attend Somerset County Technology Center for 1/2 Day, each school day.

Graduation Requirements
According to the student handbook Students must have 24 credits in order to graduate, and must have at least 10 by the end of their sophomore year.

Vocational Education
Students in grades 10–12, who wish to pursue training in a specific career path or field may attend the Somerset County Technology Center in Somerset Township.

Athletics
Somerset participates in PIAA District VI, although other neighboring school districts do not participate in District VI.:
 Baseball - Class AAA
 Basketball - Class AAA
 Cross Country - Class AA
 Football - Class AA
 Boys Golf - Class AAAA
 Rifle - Class AAAA
 Soccer - Class AA/AAA
 Softball - Class AAA
 Swimming and Diving - Class AA
 Tennis - Class AA
 Track and Field - Class AA
 Volleyball - Class AA
 Wrestling - Class AA

References

Public high schools in Pennsylvania
Schools in Somerset County, Pennsylvania